Buff leather is a strong, soft preparation of bull's or elk's hide, used in the Middle Ages onwards, that bore a rudimentary ability to deaden the effect of a blow. As armor fell into disuse at the widespread arrival of firearms to the battlefield in the 16th century, buff coats, which could in some situations survive a broadsword cut, and very rarely a pistol ball came into use more frequently. These were often worn in lieu of complete steel, either with or without a cuirass and gorget of metal. 

Modern buff leather, of which soldiers' cross belts and other accoutrements are frequently made, is for the most part made of common buckskin.

Notes

References

Medieval armour
Body armor
Leather